The State Dockyard was a ship building and maintenance facility operated by the Government of New South Wales in Carrington, Newcastle, New South Wales, Australia between 1942 and 1987.

History
In 1942, the State Dockyard opened on the site of the Government Dockyard at Dyke Point in Newcastle that had closed in 1933. Officially the New South Wales Government Engineering & Shipbuilding Undertaking, it was universally referred to as the State Dockyard.

The dockyard launched its first vessel in July 1943. By the end of World War II, it had launched two ships for the Royal Australian Navy and 22 vessels for the United States and had repaired six hundred ships.

With the cessation of large scale shipbuilding, in the 1970s it diversified into other engineering disciplines. In November 1986 a team of apprentices from the Hunter Valley Training Company completed a three-year overhaul of steam locomotive 3801 at the dockyard. The dockyard closed on 3 March 1987.

A 15,000 ton floating dock was located at Carrington in 1943 to repair damaged ships during World War II. The floating dock was scrapped in 1977 and replaced with a new one built in Japan called Muloobinba, which was eventually sold overseas in 2012.

Ships built

After closure

In 2007 the outline of the painted "STATE DOCKYARD" sign on southern roof of the former dockyard building could still be viewed from above.

Surviving ships
As of 2014, the surviving State Dockyard built ships are Cape Don, a lighthouse tender built in 1962 for the Commonwealth Lighthouse Service which is now a museum ship at Balls Head Bay, Waverton. The ferry Freshwater continue to operate for Transdev Sydney Ferries. Queenscliff was decommissioned on October 13 and has been stored ever since. Former Sydney Harbour ferries Lady Cutler and Lady McKell operate as cruise boats on Port Phillip.

Lady Herron is laid up in Newcastle.  Lady Woodward has been converted to a private houseboat and is located at Tin Can Bay.

References

External links
 Miramar Ship Index - fuller, though incomplete, production list (subscription required)
 Flickr gallery

History of Newcastle, New South Wales
Shipbuilding companies of Australia
1942 establishments in Australia
1987 disestablishments in Australia
Shipyards of New South Wales